FFPS may refer to:

 Fossil-fuel power station
 Frenchs Forest Public School, in New South Wales, Australia
 Freddy Fazbear's Pizzeria Simulator, the sixth main installment of the Five Nights at Freddy's game series

See also 
 FFP (disambiguation)